The Tecnam Astore is an Italian, low wing, two-seater, light-sport aircraft, under development by Tecnam of Naples. It was first flown in early June, 2013, and introduced at the AERO Friedrichshafen show in 2013. It is supplied complete and ready-to-fly.

The Astore replaced the Tecnam P2002 Sierra in ultralight production, although not the certified P2002JF model.

Design and development
The aircraft was designed to comply with the US Light Sport Aircraft (LSA) rules. It features a cantilever low-wing, two seats in side-by-side configuration, an enclosed cockpit under a bubble canopy, fixed tricycle landing gear with wheel pants and a single engine in tractor configuration.

The aircraft is made from aluminum sheet. Standard engines available are the  Rotax 912ULS and 912iULS, plus the  Rotax 914 four-stroke powerplants.

The Astore achieved its FAA LSA compliance in April 2014. More than thirty had been delivered by September 2014.

Operational history 
Reviewer Marino Boric described the design in a 2015 review as "beautiful".

Specifications (Astore)

See also
Partenavia Astore Design by Luigi Pascale

References

External links

Tecnam aircraft
Light-sport aircraft
Single-engined tractor aircraft
2010s Italian civil utility aircraft
Low-wing aircraft
Aircraft first flown in 2013